Matthieu Bonafous (7 March 1793 – 22 March 1852) was a French botanist born in Lyon.

Early life
Matthieu Bonafous was born on March 7, 1793, in Lyon, France.

Career
Bonafous wrote , a monograph about maize, in 1836. In it, he showed that corn was able to adapt to hostile weather conditions. For example, it could grow in sand (as in New Jersey), in humid climate (like Colombia) or in cold weather (like the Apennine Mountains).

The plant Bonafousia was named after him.

Death
He died on March 23, 1852.

Other works

References

1793 births
1852 deaths
Scientists from Lyon
19th-century French botanists
Agricultural writers